Niederöblarn Airport is a private use airport located  west-northwest of Niederöblarn, Styria, Austria.

See also
List of airports in Austria

References

External links 
 Airport record for Niederöblarn Airport at Landings.com

Airports in Austria
Styria